Janeiler Rivas Palacios (born 18 May 1988) is a Colombian professional footballer who plays as a centre back for Santos de Nasca.

Career

Carlos Stein
In February 2020, Rivas returned to Peru and joined FC Carlos Stein.

References

External links
 
 Janeiler Rivas at La Clave

1988 births
Living people
Colombian footballers
Colombian expatriate footballers
Association football defenders
C.A. Cerro players
Villa Teresa players
Boyacá Chicó F.C. footballers
Atlético Huila footballers
Alianza Atlético footballers
Millonarios F.C. players
NorthEast United FC players
Club de Gimnasia y Esgrima La Plata footballers
FC Carlos Stein players
Santos de Nasca players
Categoría Primera A players
Peruvian Primera División players
Indian Super League players
Argentine Primera División players
Footballers from Bogotá
Colombian expatriate sportspeople in Peru
Colombian expatriate sportspeople in India
Colombian expatriate sportspeople in Argentina
Expatriate footballers in Peru
Expatriate footballers in India
Expatriate footballers in Argentina